Guy-Louis Vernansal (1648-1729) was a French painter. He studied under Charles Le Brun and produced tapestry designs for the Gobelins and Beauvais manufactories. He was admitted to the Académie royale de peinture et de sculpture in 1687, though he spent much of his life in Italy, particularly Rome and Padua.

References

Members of the Académie royale de peinture et de sculpture
1648 births
1729 deaths
17th-century French painters
18th-century French painters